Dingley Island is a small island in Casco Bay, not far from Brunswick, off the coast of Maine in the United States.

In the 1750s, the island was known as Bateman's Island, and later Indian Island. However, in 1788, Captain Levi Dingley purchased the south  and in 1792 built a house there; it has been known as Dingley Island ever since.

The island was until recently connected to adjacent Great Island by a solid, . causeway that had been constructed around 1954. However, the resulting buildup of silt in Dingley Cove, in the area adjacent to the causeway, was by the mid 1990s threatening to turn the area into a salt marsh. Such a transformation would have significantly reduced the important clam harvest in this area and on associated livelihoods. The island's  of clam flats generate an average annual harvest of some $225,000.

In response to this growing environmental concern, residents and neighbors of Dingley Island began in 1996 to investigate the possibility of replacing a portion of the causeway with a bridge that would allow the restoration of normal tidal flows to the cove. Over the next several years, various partners were brought on board, including the Town of Harpswell, the US Navy Innovative Readiness Training Program (IRT), Bowdoin College students and faculty, the New Meadows River Watershed Project, the Maine Corporate Wetlands Restoration Partnership and the National Oceanic and Atmospheric Administration. These partners, led by Harpswell Resident Elsa Martz, worked together to develop and finance the bridge construction project, which cost approximately $174,000. On October 1, 2003, the community and its partners, along with Governor John Baldacci, celebrated the opening of the new bridge.

See also
 List of islands of Maine

References

Islands of Cumberland County, Maine
Harpswell, Maine
Islands of Maine